The Alexandria Warthogs were a professional ice hockey team based in Alexandria, Louisiana. They played from 1998 to 2000 as a member of the Western Professional Hockey League in the Rapides Parish Coliseum. The team folded in 2000, while the league itself was merged into the Central Hockey League in 2001 but never returned to Alexandria.

Season-by-season record

Source:

References

Ice hockey teams in Louisiana
W